Two ships of the JDF Coast Guard have been named for Cornwall, one of the three traditional counties of Jamaica.
 – a  derived from the Damen Stan 4207 in service 2005–2017
 – a Damen Stan 4207 patrol vessel

See also

Military of Jamaica
Ship names